Lynmouth is a suburb of New Plymouth in the Taranaki Region of New Zealand. It is located to the west of the city centre. 

Taranaki Base Hospital is between Lynmouth and Westown to the south.

Street Names 
Several streets in the suburb have names from Richard Blackmore's novel Lorna Doone, including characters (Lorna St, Doone St, Carver St, Ridd St), locations across the West Country of the UK (Taunton Pl, Truro St, Lyn St) and the Author himself (Blackmore St). 

This continues the general West Country naming theme which extends from the English name of the city (New Plymouth) and other streets (such as Weymouth St, Plympton St, Dorset Ave, and the main thoroughfare Devon St).

Demographics

Blagdon-Lynmouth had a population of 2,523 at the 2018 New Zealand census, an increase of 126 people (5.3%) since the 2013 census, and an increase of 108 people (4.5%) since the 2006 census. There were 975 households, comprising 1,224 males and 1,299 females, giving a sex ratio of 0.94 males per female. The median age was 34.6 years (compared with 37.4 years nationally), with 561 people (22.2%) aged under 15 years, 549 (21.8%) aged 15 to 29, 1,056 (41.9%) aged 30 to 64, and 354 (14.0%) aged 65 or older.

Ethnicities were 82.4% European/Pākehā, 21.5% Māori, 3.3% Pacific peoples, 7.1% Asian, and 1.9% other ethnicities. People may identify with more than one ethnicity.

The percentage of people born overseas was 15.2, compared with 27.1% nationally.

Although some people chose not to answer the census's question about religious affiliation, 52.6% had no religion, 35.1% were Christian, 0.5% had Māori religious beliefs, 1.0% were Hindu, 0.7% were Muslim, 1.1% were Buddhist and 1.7% had other religions.

Of those at least 15 years old, 342 (17.4%) people had a bachelor's or higher degree, and 387 (19.7%) people had no formal qualifications. The median income was $29,400, compared with $31,800 nationally. 246 people (12.5%) earned over $70,000 compared to 17.2% nationally. The employment status of those at least 15 was that 966 (49.2%) people were employed full-time, 294 (15.0%) were part-time, and 96 (4.9%) were unemployed.

Education
The school was established in 1958. The uniform consists of a polo shirt, sweatshirt and then for girls a choice of culottes or a skirt and boys wear shorts.

St Joseph's is a state integrated Catholic school.

All these schools are coeducational.

Sports

FC Western are an association football club based at Lynmouth Park, Devon Street West.

Notes

External links
 Devon Intermediate website
 St Joseph's School website

Suburbs of New Plymouth